Nicolas Navarro (born 12 March 1991) is a French long-distance runner. He competed in the men's race at the 2020 World Athletics Half Marathon Championships held in Gdynia, Poland. He represented France at the 2020 Summer Olympics in Tokyo, Japan.

References

External links 
 

Living people
1991 births
Place of birth missing (living people)
French male long-distance runners
French male marathon runners
Athletes (track and field) at the 2020 Summer Olympics
Olympic athletes of France
Olympic male marathon runners
20th-century French people
21st-century French people